The Tunnel (German:Der Tunnel) is a 1915 German silent drama film directed by William Wauer and starring Friedrich Kayssler, Fritzi Massary and Hermann Vallentin. It is the first of several film adaptations of Bernhard Kellermann's 1913 novel Der Tunnel about the construction of a vast tunnel under the Atlantic Ocean connecting Europe and America. The film was made by Paul Davidson's PAGU production company, with sets designed by art director Hermann Warm.

It still survives, unlike many films from the era, and was restored in 2010.

Despite the fact that it was a silent film, Adolf Hitler was reported to be affected by both the film and the novel, finding that the power of oratory could influence masses and change the course of human events.

Cast 
 Friedrich Kayssler 
 Fritzi Massary 
 Hermann Vallentin 
 Felix Basch 
 Hans Halden 
 Rose Veldtkirch

References

Bibliography 
 Hake, Sabine. Popular Cinema of the Third Reich. University of Texas Press, 2001.
 Domarus, Max. "Hitler, Speeches and Proclamations1932–1945 - The Chronicle of a Dictatorship, Volume One: The Years 1932 to 1934." BOLCHAZY-CARDUCCI Publishers, 1990.

External links 
 

1915 films
1910s science fiction drama films
German science fiction drama films
Films of the German Empire
German silent feature films
Films directed by William Wauer
Films based on German novels
Films based on works by Bernhard Kellermann
German black-and-white films
1915 drama films
1910s German films
1910s German-language films
Silent science fiction drama films